Wakonda is a town in Clay County, South Dakota, United States. The population was 347 at the 2020 census.

History
A post office called Wakonda has been in operation since 1886. Wakonda was platted in 1888 and its name is derived from the Sioux language.

Geography
Wakonda is located at  (43.006503, -97.105747).

Corn and soybeans are grown on the farms surrounding the town. The climate is humid continental, with hot summers and cold winters. Annual precipitation is approximately 25 inches.

Wakonda has been assigned the ZIP code 57073 and the FIPS place code 68100.

Demographics

2010 census
At the 2010 census, there were 321 people, 128 households and 72 families residing in the town. The racial make-up of the town was 98.4% White, 0.3% African American and 1.2% from other races. Hispanic or Latino of any race were 1.2% of the population.

There were 128 households, of which 29.7% had children under the age of 18 living with them, 50.8% were married couples living together, 1.6% had a female householder with no husband present, 3.9% had a male householder with no wife present, and 43.8% were non-families. 40.6% of all households were made up of individuals, and 22.6% had someone living alone who was 65 years of age or older. The average household size was 2.20 and the average family size was 3.03.

The median age in the town was 48.9 years. 21.8% of residents were under the age of 18; 3.7% were between the ages of 18 and 24; 20.2% were from 25 to 44; 27.7% were from 45 to 64; and 26.5% were 65 years of age or older. The sex make-up of the town was 49.8% male and 50.2% female.

2000 census
At the 2000 census, there were 374 people, 133 households and 90 families residing in the town. The racial make-up of the town was 99.47% White, 0.27% Native American and 0.27% from two or more races.

There were 133 households, of which 39.8% had children under the age of 18 living with them, 55.6% were married couples living together, 8.3% had a female householder with no husband present and 32.3% were non-families. 30.8% of all households were made up of individuals and 17.3% had someone living alone who was 65 years of age or older. The average household size was 2.47 and the average family size was 3.06.

27.3% of the population were under the age of 18, 4.0% from 18 to 24, 25.1% from 25 to 44, 16.8% from 45 to 64 and 26.7% were 65 years of age or older. The median age was 39 years. For every 100 females, there were 92.8 males. For every 100 females age 18 and over, there were 86.3 males.

The median household income was $31,875 and the median family income was $38,750. Males had a median income of $31,458 and females $18,250. The per capita income was $15,685. About 2.3% of families and 4.2% of the population were below the poverty line, including 6.3% of those under age 18 and none of those age 65 or over.

References

Towns in Clay County, South Dakota
Towns in South Dakota
Populated places established in 1888
1888 establishments in Dakota Territory